Mae Martin (born 2 May 1987) is a Canadian comedian, actor, and screenwriter. They wrote and starred in the Netflix comedy series Feel Good and won two Canadian Comedy Awards as part of the comedy troupe The Young and the Useless. Martin received a nomination for the BAFTA TV Award for Best Female Comedy Performance for their work on Feel Good.

Early life
Mae Martin was born in Toronto on 2 May 1987, the daughter of Canadian writer and teacher Wendy Martin and English food writer James Chatto. James, whose parents were actor Tom Chatto and talent agent Ros Chatto, appeared in the 1963 film adaptation of Lord of the Flies as a child and on the West End stage in Jesus Christ Superstar in the 1980s. Martin has an elder brother who is an academic. Their paternal uncle is an artist and actor Daniel Chatto, who is married to Queen Elizabeth II's niece Lady Sarah Chatto.

Martin was baptised in a village on the Greek island of Corfu, where their family lived for several years. James and Wendy were ex-hippies and comedy fans and the family home was filled with recordings of British classics (Monty Python’s Flying Circus, The Goon Show, Blackadder) as well as Americans such as Steve Martin.

Martin attended an all-girls school and performed on stage wearing the school's uniform. The atmosphere growing up has been—according to Martin—a "liberal utopia" in terms of sexuality, in that their parents are open-minded and Toronto is an accepting city.

Career
Martin's career started in Canada, where they were involved in the comedy troupe "The Young and the Useless". They worked at The Second City comedy club, both in the box office and as a stand-up comedian. At the age of 16, Martin was the youngest-ever nominee for the Tim Sims Encouragement Fund Award.  Martin's work in Canada includes writing for the sketch comedy series Baroness von Sketch Show. They are a two-time Canadian Screen Award winner for Best Writing in a Variety or Sketch Comedy Series for the work they did with that show's writing team.

In 2011, Martin moved to London for a fresh start, falling in love with the city, and at first working dead-end jobs in order to focus on breaking in to British comedy. Their 2015 Edinburgh Fringe Festival show was entitled Mae Martin: Us, which led to the BBC Radio 4 series Mae Martin's Guide to 21st Century Sexuality. Martin has appeared on the British television and radio programme The Now Show, and has co-hosted GrownUpLand.

Dope, the 2017 Edinburgh show, was titled in reference to recreational drugs as well as to dopamine, the brain chemical associated with compulsive behaviour: love can also be a drug. It was based on years of research, drawing on the work of Dr Gabor Maté, who defines addiction as any behaviour or substance that a person uses to relieve pain in the short term, but which leads to negative consequences in the long term. Without addressing the root cause of the pain, a person may try to stop but will ultimately crave further relief and be prone to relapse. By this definition there are many things in modern culture that have the potential to become addictive such as gambling, sex, food, work, social media, and of course, drugs. Maté featured in the 2017 two-part Mae Martin's Guide to 21st Century Addiction.

Dope, which is about Martin's addictive personality—they described it as like having "an easily-awoken psychopathic shrimp" in their head—was modified into a half-hour Netflix comedy special, released in January 2019 as part of the Comedians of the World collection. This led to Feel Good, the Channel 4/Netflix comedy series which Martin co-created, wrote, and starred in. The second season was released in 2021. (The other co-creator is Joe Hampson; the pair have worked together on and off since 2012.)  Guardian interviewer Simon Hattenstone identified one of the underlying themes being the guilt of coming from privilege, as opposed to the many addicts Martin met in rehab, who had grown up in poor or addicted families and never had a chance. In the same paper, Lucy Mangan praised the series as "immaculately written" and "properly funny". In 2019, Martin also released a YA book entitled Can Everyone Please Calm Down? A Guide to 21st Century Sexuality.

More recently, they signed a deal with Objective Fiction.

In 2022, they appeared in LOL: Last One Laughing Canada. Later that year, they appeared in the HBO Max series The Flight Attendant on a recurring role as Grace St. James. In progress is a "teen thriller comedy" with Nextflix. Martin is also working on two films with writing partner Hampson: a rom-com and a thriller called Gene.

Personal life
Martin describes childhood obsessions with Bette Midler, The Kids in the Hall, Pee-wee Herman and the Rocky Horror Show. At 11 years old, Martin was taken to a comedy club, and at that point the addiction became stand-up comedy. Martin and two friends became known as "the Groupies" for going to see Family Circus Maximus (a play from The Second City improv troupe) 160 times in a year. Embracing being "a weird kid" helped ease the path to a comedy career.

Martin became addicted to drugs and consequently underwent rehabilitation, using stories of this as the basis for some stand-up routines. Addiction made Martin leave home at 16. Abusive relationships were normalised in the night-time scene: Martin said, "If you put a teenage girl in any industry like that, there are going to be people taking advantage."

Martin's cultural influences include Stand by Me, a 1986 American coming-of-age comedy-drama adventure film based on Stephen King's 1982 novella The Body; the people-pleasing maitre d character in Beauty and the Beast, the 1991 adaptation as a Disney animated feature film; Waiting for Guffman, a 1996 American mockumentary comedy film following a troupe of actors using improvised dialogue; and the Spice Girls, specifically the video from the 1997 song "Viva Forever".

Martin came out publicly as non-binary in 2021. Martin uses they/them and she/her pronouns, saying, "I love it when people say 'they' but I don't mind 'she' at ALL." They have dated both men and women, stating in April 2021 that they are bisexual after previously resisting labelling their sexuality. In June 2021, Mae described themself as "a queer person".  Martin shared that they had top surgery in late 2021.

Filmography

References

External links
 
 
 
 

1987 births
Actors from Toronto
Bisexual actors
Bisexual comedians
Bisexual non-binary people
Bisexual writers
Canadian comedy writers
Canadian expatriates in England
Canadian non-binary actors
Canadian Screen Award winners
Canadian sketch comedians
Canadian stand-up comedians
Canadian television writers
Comedians from Toronto
Canadian LGBT actors
Living people
Non-binary comedians
Non-binary writers
Transgender comedians
Writers from Toronto
Chatto family
Transgender non-binary people
Canadian LGBT comedians